Jakub Feter (born May 3, 1987) is a Polish football player who plays for Lech Rypin as a midfielder. He played in the 2007 FIFA U-20 World Cup in Canada.

Career

Club
He began his playing career at Szkoły Mistrzostwa Sportowego in Łodz. After 2 seasons in the 4th division with LKS Bałucz and UKS SMS Bałucz, Feter was bought in 2007 by UKS SMS Łódź.

International
He also was called up for the U-20 tournament in Jordan, before playing in the 2007 U-20 World Cup in Canada.

References

External links
 

Living people
1987 births
Polish footballers
Poland youth international footballers
Place of birth missing (living people)
Association football midfielders
UKS SMS Łódź players